Professional wrestling in the United Kingdom spans over one hundred years but became popular when the then new independent television network ITV began showing it in 1955, firstly on Saturday afternoons and then also in a late-night midweek slot. It was at its peak of popularity when the television show World of Sport was launched in the mid-1960s, making household names out of Adrian Street, Mick McManus, Count Bartelli, Giant Haystacks, Jackie Pallo, Big Daddy, Steve Veidor, Dynamite Kid, and Kendo Nagasaki. 

The sport remained a mainstay of British culture until World of Sport's cancellation and then finally as a stand-alone programme until 1988. Despite the end of ITV coverage, a largely untelevised live circuit – with some promotions featuring the traditional British style of professional wrestling and others more fashioned after the contemporary American independent scene – survives and indeed thrives in this territory to the present day.

History

Beginning
For many centuries, there have been wrestling tournaments (for example in Cornish wrestling or Scottish Backhold) throughout the UK where individual prizes have been comparable to yearly salaries and where monarchs and lords have been in the audiences or indeed participated.

At the start of the 20th century, wrestling was introduced to the public as part of a variety act to spice up the limited action involved in the bodybuilder strongman attractions. One of its earliest stars was a Cornish–American ex–miner named Jack Carkeek (world Cornish wrestling champion in 1886), who would challenge audience members to last ten minutes with him in the ring.

The development of wrestling within the UK brought legitimate Greco–Roman grappler Georg Hackenschmidt who was born in the Russian Empire to the country, where he would quickly associate himself with promoter and entrepreneur Charles B. Cochran. Cochran took Hackenschmidt under his wing and booked him into a match in which Hackenschmidt defeated another top British wrestler, Tom Cannon, for the European Greco-Roman Heavyweight Championship. This win gave Hackenschmidt a credible claim to the world title, cemented in 1905 with a win over American Heavyweight Champion Tom Jenkins in the United States. Hackenschmidt took a series of bookings in Manchester for a then impressive £150 a week. Noting Hackenschmidt's legitimately dominant style of wrestling threatened to kill crowd interest, Cochran persuaded Hackenschmidt to learn showmanship from Cannon and wrestle many of his matches for entertainment rather than sport; this displayed the future elements of "sports entertainment".

Numerous big-name stars came and went during the early inception of wrestling within the UK, with many, like Hackenschmidt, leaving for the US. The resulting loss of big-name stars sent the business into decline before the outbreak of World War I in 1914 halted it completely.

All-in wrestling

While various styles of amateur wrestling continued as legitimate sports, grappling as a promotional business did not return to Britain until the beginning of the 1930s when the success of the more worked aspects of professional wrestling in America, like gimmickry and showmanship, were introduced to British wrestling. It was with this revival that the more submission–based Catch As Catch Can wrestling style, which had already replaced Greco Roman wrestling as the dominant style of professional wrestling in the United States back in the 1890s, became the new dominant style in Britain. With Lancashire catch-as-catch-can already a major amateur sport particularly in Northern England, there existed a ready-made source of potential recruits to professional wrestling.

Amateur wrestler, Sir Atholl Oakeley got together with fellow grappler Henry Irslinger to launch one of the first promotions to employ the new style of wrestling which was coined "All–in" wrestling. Though, like many wrestlers throughout the business, Oakley would claim his wrestling was entirely legitimate, his claim was highly dubious. Under the British Wrestling Association banner, Oakley's promotion took off with wrestlers such as Tommy Mann, Black Butcher Johnson, Jack Pye, Norman the Butcher, College Boy, and Jack Sherry on the roster, while Oakley himself would win a series of matches to be crowned the first British Heavyweight Champion.

The business was reaching one of its highest points at the time, with the best part of forty regular venues in London alone. The great demand for wrestling, however, meant there were not enough skilled amateurs to go around, and many promoters switched to more violent styles, with weapons and chairshots part of the proceedings. Women wrestlers and mud-filled rings also became common place. In the late 1930s, the London County Council banned professional wrestling, leaving the business in rough shape just before World War II.

Mountevans' committee

After the war, attempts to relaunch the business in 1947 failed to catch on with journalists who condemned the gimmickry calling the show fake. The revelation of this, and the general chaos which had surrounded All In Wrestling prior to the War, prompted Admiral Lord Mountevans, a fan of the sport, to get together with Commander Campbell (a member of the popular "The Brains Trust" radio panel show), member of parliament Maurice Webb and Olympic wrestler Norman Morell to create a committee to produce official rules for wrestling. These rules became known as Admiral-Lord Mountevans rules.

The most notable action of the committee was to create seven formal weight divisions, calling for champions to be crowned at each weight. These weight divisions included lightweight (154-pound limit), welterweight (165), middleweight (176), heavy middleweight (187), light heavyweight (198), mid heavyweight (209), and heavyweight. Many of these rules diverged heavily from those in used in American Wrestling – five-minute rounds (three minutes for title matches), two public warnings for rule breaking before a disqualification, "knockouts" (countouts) and disqualifications counting as automatic two falls in best of three falls matches (which were predominant), and no follow-up moves allowed on a grounded opponent.

The existence of the committee was readily acknowledged by promoters who used its existence to counter any accusations of wrongdoings within the business. It was the promoters themselves, however, who revolutionized the business. During this time, under the guise of an alliance of promoters attempting to regulate the sport and uphold the committee's ideas, the promoters created a cartel based on America's National Wrestling Alliance territory system that was designed to carve up control of the business among a handful of promoters—which it did in 1952 under the name of Joint Promotions.

Joint Promotions

Joint Promotions was represented in London by the Dale Martin promotion, which had incorporated in 1948, and involved Les Martin, and Jack, Johnny and Billy Dale, whose real last names were, in fact, Abby not Dale. Other promoters included Norman Morell and Ted Beresford in Yorkshire, Billy Best in Liverpool, Arthur Wright in Manchester and George de Relywyskow in Scotland, with Arthur Green the secretary of the group. By agreeing to rotate talent and block out rival promoters, Joint Promotions was soon running 40 shows a week, while leaving wrestlers with little bargaining power. The financial advantages of this arrangement helped the members survive the tough conditions caused by a post-war tax that took 25% of all entertainment revenue. Other promoters were not so successful. The closure of Harringay Arena in 1954 was the last straw for Atholl Oakeley, and Joint Promotions were the only major player left to benefit when Chancellor Peter Thorneycroft abolished the entertainment tax in the 1957 budget.

From a press report, some wrestlers decided to go on strike against the Joint Promotions cartel and formed the Wrestlers' Welfare Society for hardship relief but also to act as an employment agency. Bill Benny ('Man Mountain', 1918, Cornwall - 1963, Manchester) wrestler, promoter and nightclubs owner, was a founder and was quoted, "We're the pirates".

One of Joint Promotions' first moves was establishing (and controlling) the championships called for by the Mountevans' committee. At first, this proved a profitable venture, with title matches leading to raised ticket prices. However, perhaps inevitably, attempts to extend this success by bringing in additional titles led to overexposure. While the World and British titles had some credibility (particularly as they were often placed on the more legitimate wrestlers), the addition of European, Empire/Commonwealth, Scottish, Welsh, and area championships got out of hand, and at one point there were conceivably 70 different titleholders to keep track of within Joint Promotions alone. Actually, the British, European and World titles were given most prominence. The "regional" titles were mainly honorific, with only the "southern Area" titles actually being fought for. The Empire/Commonwealth titles were a "long stop" title, being used by promotions outside of the Joint monopoly, for the most part.

Television
But while titles had some success, it was television that took British wrestling to the next level. The first show aired on ABC and ATV (the weekend franchise holders on ITV) on 9 November 1955, featuring Francis St Clair Gregory (9 times Cornish wrestling heavyweight title holder and father of Tony St Clair) versus Mike Marino and Cliff Beaumont versus Bert Royal live from West Ham baths. The show was successful, and wrestling became a featured attraction every Saturday afternoon from Autumn to Spring each year. In 1964, it went full-time as part of the World of Sport show.

Televised wrestling allowed wrestlers to become household names and allowing personality to get a wrestler over just as much as size. The exposure of wrestling on television proved the ultimate boost to the live event business as wrestling became part of mainstream culture. By the mid-1960s, Joint Promotions had doubled their live event schedule to somewhere in the region of 4,500 shows a year. Every town of note had a show at least once a month, and at some points more than 30 cities had a weekly date.

The style of wrestling at the time was unique – not only in terms of the rule system, but also for the strong emphasis on clean technical wrestling. Heels made up a minority of the roster, with most shows containing an abnormally high proportion of clean sportsmanly matches between two "blue-eyes" (as faces were known backstage in the UK). This would remain the case for several decades to come. Gimmick matches were a rarity, midget wrestling failed to catch on, while women were banned by the Greater London Council until the late 1970s. Tag wrestling, however, did prove to be popular, with televised tag matches happening a mere eight or so times a year to keep them special.

The success of wrestling on television did however create a better opportunity for the independent groups. The opposition to Joint came from the Australian–born promoter, Paul Lincoln. Having promoted shows in the 1950s with himself in the main event as masked heel Doctor Death, Lincoln led a consortium of independent promoters under the British Wrestling Federation (BWF) whose name was used for a rival championship, built around Heavyweight champion Bert Assirati who split away from Joint Promotions in 1958 while still champion. Although Joint Promotions considered the title vacant and held a tournament for a new champion (won by Billy Joyce), Assirati continued to claim it within the BWF.

The group later built itself around a new champion in Shirley Crabtree, a young bodybuilder who won the title after it was vacated by Assirati while injured in 1960. The BWF faded away in the late 1960s after a campaign of pestilence by a disgruntled Assirati (vastly superior as a shooter to Crabtree) in the form of unsolicited appearances and challenges to his successor at BWF shows, eventually resulting in the abrupt retirement of Crabtree in 1966. Lincoln's own promotion was bought out and amalgamated into Joint Promotions at the end of the 1960s.

Max Crabtree and Big Daddy
By 1975, the stranglehold of Joint Promotions had almost crumbled, with many of its founding members retiring and the company being bought out several times, leading to the wrestling industry being run as a private subsidiary of state-run bookmakers William Hill PLC a public company whose staff had little experience of the unique business. Finally, promotions were left in the hands of Max Crabtree, the brother of Shirley, who was headhunted by Joint as the most experienced booker still in the business.

Crabtree produced the next boom in British wrestling by creating the legend of Big Daddy, the alter ego of Shirley, who had been unemployed for the best part of 6 years before joining Joint in 1972 as the heel "Battling Guardsman" and then being rebranded as Big Daddy two years later. After an initial transition period as a heel/tweener in the mid-1970s (most notable for his tag team partnership with future arch-rival Giant Haystacks and a heel vs heel feud with legendary masked wrestler Kendo Nagasaki, whom Daddy unmasked during a 1975 televised bout), from the summer of 1977 onwards, Big Daddy became a larger-than-life fan favourite of children and pensioners alike. That he was no longer a bodybuilder youth, rather an overweight man in his forties, did not seem to be an obstacle as every major heel in the country was defeated by Daddy. This was usually in short order with Daddy gaining quick wins in his few singles matches and cleaning up quickly when tagged into his more frequent tag matches. Disgruntled conotemporaries such as Adrian Street have attributed this to Shirley's lack of conditioning, although Max in response has insisted that this was what people wanted to see.

Big Daddy became the best-known wrestler in British history and even had his own comic strip in Buster comic. Due to his popularity, Crabtree's run was extended by carefully positioning him in tag matches, allowing a host of young partners (which included Davey Boy Smith, Dynamite Kid, Gentleman Chris Adams and Steven Regal) to carry the match before tagging Daddy in for the finish. 

Basing a whole cartel around one performer, however, though good for television, produced mixed results for live events. While Big Daddy was a massive draw in terms of family audiences, in equal part he alienated much of the existing adult fanbase for wrestling. Many wrestlers shared the adult fans' dislike of the Big Daddy phenomenon. They were dissatisfied with their position within the Joint Promotions and soon looked elsewhere for exposure mainly outside the UK as a whole. As a result, there was a rise in New Japan Pro-Wrestling and Calgary's junior-heavyweight divisions, both of which had their roots in British wrestling of the time.

Rise of All Star, end of ITV era and aftermath

One English promoter that benefited from the backlash against the Crabtrees was Merseyside promoter Brian Dixon, who had started in the business during his youth, running the Jim Breaks fan club, now had several years experience running his own firm, All Star Wrestling, and began capitalizing on this disaffection taking many of Joint Promotions' top champions.

Professional wrestling as a whole seemingly began to fall into disarray as the true nature of wrestling began to fall into question as many newspapers tried to expose the worked aspects of the sport. However, this trend did not ultimately harm the industries as the suspension of disbelief was all too easy to maintain for fans, even if they knew the truth. On 28 September 1985, the Crabtrees received another blow when World of Sport was taken off the air. Wrestling instead got its own show, but the time slot changed from week to week, slowly driving away the regular audience. Far worse for Joint Promotions, however, was that with their contract up for renewal, they were forced to share the TV rights as part of a rotation system with All Star Wrestling and America's World Wrestling Federation (WWF).

The introduction of American wrestling to the UK and the eventual axing in 1988 by Greg Dyke of Wrestling shows on terrestrial TV saw the eclipse of Joint Promotions from its dominant position in the British wrestling scene. The promotion, renamed Ring Wrestling Stars (RWS) in 1991, continued to tour the old venues with Big Daddy in the headline slot until his retirement in December 1993 after suffering a stroke. Even then, Max Crabtree continued to tour, using the same business model, with British–born former WWF star "British Bulldog" Davey Boy Smith replacing Daddy as the headlining household name, until Smith was lured back to the WWF in the summer of 1994. Thereafter, RWS went into decline and eventually ceased promoting in 1995.

By contrast, All Star had played its cards well with regard to its two years of TV exposure, using the time in particular to build up a returning Kendo Nagasaki as its lead heel and establishing such storylines as his tag team-cum-feud with Rollerball Rocco and his "hypnotism" of Robbie Brookside. The end of TV coverage left many of these storylines at a cliffhanger and consequently All Star underwent a box office boom as hardcore fans turned up to live shows to see what happened next, and kept coming for several years due to careful use of show-to-show storylines. Headline matches frequently pitted Nagasaki in violent heel vs heel battles against the likes of Rocco, Dave 'Fit' Finlay, Skull Murphy (Peter Northey) and even Giant Haystacks, or at smaller venues teaming with regular partner "Blondie" Bob Barrett to usually defeat blue-eye opposition. All Star's post-television boom wore off after 1993 when Nagasaki retired for a second time. However, the promotion kept afloat on live shows at certain established venues and particularly on the holiday camp circuit and remains active right up to the present. 
 
Meanwhile, the WWF continued on Sky television until moving to BT Sport in early 2020, while its chief rival back home in America, WCW made the jump from late-night ITV to British Wrestling's old Saturday afternoon ITV timeslot, where it stayed until moving to Super Channel at the end of 1995 and then Channel 5 on Friday evenings from mid 1999 until WCW's demise in 2001. Both major 1990s US promotions made several arena tours of the UK (as later did TNA, Ring of Honor and others) while the WWF even held the pay-per-view event SummerSlam '92 in London's Wembley Stadium before a crowd of around 80,000.  The wrestling relationship between ITV and WCW's old parent company TBS was renewed in 2019 when TBS's AEW Dynamite began airing on ITV4 on Friday nights, being added to ITV Hub each previous evening.

Traditional/"Old school" British wrestling - the modern era 

After the demise of Joint/RWS, All Star's chief rival on the live circuit was Scott Conway's TWA (The Wrestling Alliance) promotion, founded as the Southeastern Wrestling Alliance in 1989. Many smaller British promoters were increasingly abandoning their British identity in favour of "WWF Tribute" shows, with British performers crudely imitating World Wrestling Federation stars. By the start of the 21st century, many of these tribute acts such as the "UK Undertaker" and "Big Red Machine" were headlining All Star shows. Conway began to promote his TWA as an alternative, featuring more serious wrestling (in much the same way as All Star had previously targeted Joint fans disaffected with Big Daddy).

All Star duly adapted to meet the challenge, recruiting a new generation of wrestlers such as Dean Allmark and Robbie Dynamite and signing up such stars as "American Dragon" Bryan Danielson. The promotional war came to an abrupt end in 2003 when Conway relocated to Thailand, closing down the TWA (which he briefly tried to transplant to his new country as the "Thai Wrestling Alliance"). Nowadays, All Star tours extensively and successfully with shows mixing British Wrestling tradition with family entertainment, while another company, John Freemantle's group Premier Promotions, (established in 1987) presents a more purist version of British Wrestling.

The gap left by TWA in the traditional British scene was later filled by such promotions as Revolution British Wrestling (RBW) and later still LDN's Academy/Spirit League. In the mid-2000s, Adam Mumford's Revolution British Wrestling promotion (run as an adjunct of his wrestling tape trading business in much the same manner as the American Ring Of Honor promotion in its infancy) picked up where TWA left off with promoting the British Welterweight and British Middleweight titles. After the company ceased promoting in 2006, LDN Wrestling emerged as a British-based World of Sport–style product that has brought many of the legendary names out of retirement such as Kendo Nagasaki, Johnny Saint and Johnny Kincaid. In November 2008 along with the Wrestling Channel, it presented a "World of Sport Reunion Show" in front of a sellout crowd. Starting in the autumn of 2010, it began a full-time touring schedule of shows in a bid to compete with All Star, often at some of All Star's main regular venues. LDN continues to tour, but has largely ditched its traditional British style and become an Americanised promotion of the kind described below.

A number of the new generation of British wrestlers who made their name on the new domestic circuit would go on to international recognition, including Doug Williams and Nigel McGuinness. Other major US promotions, however, opted to use wrestlers from the traditional promotions such as the Team UK in TNA's 2004 X Cup which featured All Star Wrestling wrestlers James Mason, Dean Allmark, Robbie Dynamite and Frankie Sloan. Mason would also guest on WWE Raw in 2008, defeating MVP.

With the advent of digital satellite television British wrestling – including vintage ITV footage – would be featured heavily on the short-lived Wrestling Channel. Premier Promotions briefly gained some coverage on BBC Three when its matches were featured on Johnny Vaughan's short-lived revival of World of Sport.

Traditional British Wrestling survived the COVID-19 pandemic with both All Star and Premier resuming operations in late 2021, the former belatedly celebrating its 50th anniversary which had fallen during lockdown. Additionally, Conway announced plans to reactivate the TWA, while promoter Steve Barker's Rumble Wrestling also resumed operations after a gap of several years. In one of its first shows back, Nino Bryant defeated Lewis Mayhew in the final of a Knockout Tournament in Kemsley, Sittingbourne, Kent on Friday 29th October to win the vacant British Lightweight Championship, renamed in honour of late referee Mal Mason. This was fought under full Mountevans rules. He won by 2 falls to 1 in an extra round 9. The tournament was a 8-man tournament with the opening rounds held in July shortly after Freedom Day in the UK. With this result, at least one new champion had been crowned in every Mountevans Rules weight division since the start of the 21st century (and a new British champion in every division except Heavy Middleweight).

While All Star maintains a nationwide touring schedule around the year, Rumble's shows are largely confined to the south east of England. However, it is accessible to the rest of the country, indeed the world, via a regularly updated YouTube channel covering the matches from most of their house shows along with an episodic online TV show with commentary by veteran All Star ring announcer Lee Bamber who had previously commented on and provided links for VHS compilation tapes of wrestling footage from ITV and S4C.  In July 2022, All Star announced that Dixon would be stepping down from on-the-road aspects of his job as All Star promoter (while continuing to maintain a back seat role at the company's office) and be replaced as road manager by referee Joseph Allmark, Dixon's grandson via his daughter, ring announcer Laetitia and his son-in-law, wrestler Dean Allmark.

"American style"/"New school" promotions 
Standing apart from all this was the rise of "Americanised" promotions in the UK. One extremely early attempt at this kind of promotion in the UK was a set of "American–style"/entertainment-orientated TV tapings arranged by Jackie Pallo in 1990. In the early 1990s, WAW and Hammerlock, both run by veterans of the traditional British circuit, emerged producing shows more in line with the slick entertainment ethos of American wrestling. In the late 1990s, the success and popularity of the American Extreme Championship Wrestling promotion, which specifically emphasised its own small scale and "underground" nature, combined with the growth of internet discussion boards and tape trading, generated a new interest in British wrestling among local fans of the American wrestling scene. Many of the promotions which started during this time were directly influenced by the style of ECW and most were designed to appeal more to smart mark fans rather than the more mainstream audiences targeted by the classic British wrestling era. The most high-profile American-style promotion of this period was the Ultimate Wrestling Alliance (UWA) which aired a regular television show, Wrestling Rampage, on controversial cable channel L!VE TV for a period in the spring and summer of 1999.

The most prominent of the "New School" promotions of the 2000s – including the Doncaster based 1 Pro Wrestling and the recently revived Frontier Wrestling Alliance run by Alex Shane – used British talent alongside a variety of imported international stars, including former WWE and TNA talent. A large number of other smaller promotions were established throughout the 2000s, focusing entirely on British talent. Boundaries between the "traditional" and "Americanised" promotions were increasingly broken down after FWA's 2001 "Old School vs New School" storyline which saw a group of traditional ITV–era veterans invade the promotion. Other "New School" UK promotions also achieved television coverage, Wakefield based UKW – UK Wrestling Experience whose TV product took the form of a weekly tape delay television programme, UK Wrestling Mayhem, on My Channel (Sky Channel – 219) on Thursdays at 2100h, hosted by Lance Shepherd and Vicky Bell and taped at the Horbury Bridge Thunderdome.

In 2005, British television network ITV tried to make use of the revived popularity of professional wrestling by starting a Saturday night prime time show called Celebrity Wrestling, featuring celebrities in wrestling style bouts. The show was treated with derision by professional wrestling fans and was shortly moved to Sunday mornings after being beaten in audience share by Doctor Who for five weeks. A more positive outlet of publicity for British Wrestling was TNA's spin-off show British Bootcamp which saw local stars Marty Scurll, twins Hannah and Holly Blossom and former British Welterweight Champion Rockstar Spud vying for an opportunity with the company, which Spud went on to win. Other British wrestlers like Joel Redman, PAC, Martin Stone and Britani Knight (daughter of veteran Ricky Knight) have received contracts with the WWE on its talent development show NXT. Redman and PAC – billed as Oliver Grey and Adrian Neville respectively – won a January 2013 tournament to be crowned the first ever NXT Tag Team Champions. In March 2014, Neville would go on to win the NXT Championship while Knight, wrestling as Paige, would debut on the main roster in April 2014 and win the Divas Championship.

Return to ITV and WWE's NXT UK/ NXT Europe
The mid 2010s saw an increasing drive to return British Wrestling to ITV. A pilot for World of Sport Wrestling (branding itself as a direct revival of the old slot on the World Of Sport programme) was filmed at the Fairfield Halls, Croydon in 2013 but rejected by ITV was eventually posted to YouTube in mid 2015. Another attempt, filmed in a TV studio and again touted in the media as the "return" of UK wrestling to ITV, was given an airing by ITV on New Year's Eve 2016. A follow up series of 10 episodes was due to be filmed at Preston Guild Hall in May 2017 but this was postponed until a year later. Around this time, WWE also took an active interest in the local UK wrestling circuit, organising a WWE United Kingdom Championship Tournament in Blackpool in January 2017, which crowned the inaugural WWE United Kingdom Champion.

The World Of Sport Wrestling TV revival resumed production with tapings 10–12 May 2018 and transmission on ITV 28 July - 29 September 2018. This was followed by six live tour dates (of an originally scheduled nine) in January/February 2019. Meanwhile, WWE once again held the WWE United Kingdom Championship Tournament in London in June 2018. WWE introduced World Of Sport and UK Wrestling legend Johnny Saint as its General Manager earlier that month for their newly established NXT UK brand of which the UK Championship would be the top championship. At the WWE UK Tournament Day 1 taping, Saint along with Triple H introduced the NXT UK show for their UK wrestlers and also established the NXT UK Women's Championship and the NXT UK Tag Team Championship.

In 2020, at Wrestlemania 36, Scotland's Drew McIntyre became the first British wrestler to win the WWE Championship.  NXT UK tapings were halted after the initial COVID-19 lockdown (with TV coverage replaced with recap shows) but resumed on 17 September at BT Sport studios with no live audience - a set up which had proved workable for several boxing title fights over the previous few months and had been used by WWE in the US for lockdown tapings.  This and subsequent tapings for the same show at the same location were the only professional wrestling matches held in the United Kingdom between the March 2020 stay at home order and the aforementioned Freedom Day in July 2021.

The final episode of NXT UK aired on 1 September 2022, following the announcement that the NXT UK brand would be replaced by NXT Europe in 2023.

Nations of the United Kingdom

Wales
Wales had a strong foothold in British Wrestling, dominated by Orig Williams from the mid/late 1960s onward up to the 21st century. Williams' British Wrestling Federation (a name recycled from the aforementioned 1960s promotional alliance) produced Welsh–language television wrestling programmes for the bilingual S4C channel in the 1980s and 1990s under the title Reslo. One compilation from the early 1990s was released on VHS (in English) as Wrestling Madness. Since Wlliams' death in November 2009, the torch has been passed to his protégé Alan Ravenhill, who operates Welsh Wrestling and runs regular shows in every county of Wales, and hosted a historical event at Harlech Castle to crown a new Welsh Heavyweight Champion in May 2010. A rival promotion, Britannia Wrestling Promotions (BWP) also operates shows throughout the North Wales coast.Other promotions in the country include Slammasters Wrestling, Basix, Pro Wrestling Karnage, Exist, Exposure Wrestling, Royal Imperial Wrestling, and Creation Pro.

Scotland
Scotland was represented as part of Joint Promotions by Relwyskow Promotions, run by the family of George de Relwyskow. Relwyskow Promotions was not included in the buyouts of Joint Promotions in the 1960s-1980s and remained under its original management while continuing to receive a proportion of Joint Promotions' TV coverage. It remained active until the retirement of Ann Relwyskow in the 1990s. In 1989 and again in 1991, television tapings were held in Scotland and matches screened on Grampian Television and STV. During the 1960s, World Lightweight champion George Kidd was a successful television broadcaster, hosting his own chat show in Scotland's ITV regions.

Northern Ireland (and Republic of Ireland)
The dominant promoter in Northern Ireland in the 1960s/1970s was former Irish national Olympic coach David "Fit" Finlay Senior who promoted wrestling on both sides of the border and trained such stars as his son Dave Finlay, Eddie Hammill and Sean "Rasputin" Doyle. Due to The Troubles, in the 1970s and 1980s these wrestlers and others would migrate to mainland Britain and find success there (in Hamill's case, under a mask, billed as Kung Fu.) The younger Finlay would become a multiple champion and later succeed in America. Although RTÉ never had a wrestling show of its own, in the mid 1980s, a major championship match between Mighty John Quinn and Haystacks in Claremorris was publicised with a contract signing ceremony of Derek Davis' Davis at Large show. Later in the 1980s and 1990s, transmissions of Williams' Reslo programme on S4C could be received in much of the southern and eastern Republic of Ireland and Williams organised several tours of Ireland with his show's roster during this time. In the 21st century, the dominant New School promotion in Ireland has been Irish Whip Wrestling.

See also

History of professional wrestling
List of professional wrestling attendance records in the United Kingdom
Professional wrestling promotions in the United Kingdom

References

Selected Bibliography
Lister, John. "The History of British Wrestling". Pro Wrestling Press #6, (May 2002)
 House of Deception Golden Age 1911–1979: bibliography, photos, Lister article.
Curley, Mallory. Beatle Pete, Time Traveller (2005): information on Liverpool Stadium wrestling promoter Bill Best, uncle of original Beatles drummer Pete Best.
 "Catch – The Hold Not Taken", a documentary on the origins of catch-as-catch-can wrestling